Rafaël is a 2018 Dutch drama film directed by Ben Sombogaart. The film is based on the book of the same name, written by Christine Otten. In July 2018, it was one of nine films shortlisted to be the Dutch entry for the Best Foreign Language Film at the 91st Academy Awards, but it was not selected.

Cast
 Mehdi Meskar as Rafaël
 Melody Klaver as Kimmy
 Nabil Mallat as Nazir

References

External links
 

2018 films
2018 drama films
Dutch drama films
2010s Dutch-language films